Squirrel Hill is a neighborhood in West Philadelphia, south of Baltimore Ave and west of Clark Park.  It shares a border with the Spruce Hill and Cedar Park neighborhoods. By some accounts, this neighborhood is within the boundaries of the University City district.

See also
 Squirrel Hill - A neighborhood in Pittsburgh, Pennsylvania.

References

Neighborhoods in Philadelphia
University City, Philadelphia